A list of the tallest structures in Poland. The list contains all types of structures, that exist or existed in the area that is now Poland.

Tallest structures

See also
List of tallest buildings in Poland

References

External links
 http://skyscraperpage.com/diagrams/?searchID=38003160

Tallest
Poland